The counts of Nantes were originally the Frankish rulers of the Nantais under the Carolingians and eventually a capital city of the Duchy of Brittany. Their county served as a march against the Bretons of the Vannetais. Carolingian rulers would sometimes attack Brittany through the region of the Vannetais, making Nantes a strategic asset. In the mid-ninth century, the county finally fell to the Bretons and the title became a subsidiary title of the Breton rulers. The control of the title by the Breton dukes figured prominently in the history of the duchy. The County of Nantes was given to Hoel, a disinherited son of a duke. He lost the countship due to a popular uprising. That uprising presented an opportunity for King Henry II of England to attack the Breton duke. In the treaty ending their conflicts, the Breton duke awarded the county to Henry II.

Frankish counts
---- – 778 Roland, as prefect of the Breton March - subject of the Chanson de Roland 
786 – 818 Guy, as prefect of the Breton March, successor to Roland 
818 – 831 Lambert I - exiled by Louis the Pious and replaced by Ricwin.
831 – 841 Ricwin -a comes of Charlemange, and fidelis of Louis the Pious, he opposed Nominoe in the founding of Redon Abbey
841 – 843 Renaud
843 – 846 Lambert II
846 – 849 Amaury, imposed by Charles the Bald in opposition to Lambert II 
849 – 851 Lambert II (restored)
852 – 860 Salomon
861 – 866 Robert the Strong, also Count of Anjou
866 – --- Hugh of the Breton March 
--- – --- Henry of the Breton March 
--- – --- Odo, the future Odo, King of West Francia, as the Marquis of Neustria
886 – 896 Berengar II of Neustria as Margrave of the Breton March, later also Count of Rennes
896 – 911
911 – --- Robert, the future Robert I of France as the Marquis of Neustria

Kingdom of Brittany
Alan I, King of Brittany ruled Nantes as King of Brittany until his death in 907.

Norse occupation from 914 to 938
907 - c 914 - vacant

Rognvaldr also known as Ragenold
914 - 919   - Rognvaldr as a leader of the Loire Raiding Fleet lands in Nantes; King Gourmaelon killed in battle, King Robert of Neustria continues conflict with invading Norse.
 919 - Robert cedes Nantes to Rognvaldr who renames it Namsborg, makes peace and agrees to convert to Christianity for being allowed to keep Brittany.
 924 - Rognvaldr ravages the lands between the Seine and the Loire and then Burgundy but is finally defeated at Chalmont.
 927 - The Franks launch another failed attempt to retake Nantes. 
 930 - Rognvaldr reigns until his death.

Hakom Rognvaldrsson also known as Incon
 930 - Hakon Rognvaldrsson, known to the Franks as Incon,  Norse leader after the death of Rognvaldr, King Rudolph of the Franks defeats Incon at Estress that same year.
 931 - Breton peasant revolt broken and their leader Felecan killed.
 935 - Incon isolated after William 1 Longsword of Normandy reconciles with the Franks and exiled Bretons start returning from Britain.
 936 - 938 - Alan Barbetorte returns to Brittany from England and engages the Norse, Incon slain at recapture of Nantes in 937.

Later counts
938 – 952 Alan I Barbetorte, grandson of Alan I, King of Brittany, also Duke of Brittany
952 – 960  Drogo, his son
960 – 981 Hoël I, Alan Barbetorte's eldest illegitimate son
981 – c.988  Guerech, Hoël's brother
990 – 992 Conan I, Count of Nantes by conquest  
992 – 1004 Judicaël; Hoël's illegitimate son
1004 – 1038 : Budic, Judicael's son
1038 – 1051 : Matthew I, Burdic's son
1051 – 1063 : Judith, Matthew's aunt and Budic's sister, (with her husband Alain Canhiart)
1054 – 1084 : Hoël II, their son, married to Hawise, Duchess of Brittany
1084 – 1103 : Matthew II, Hoël and Hawise's second son
1103 – 1119 Alan II, Matthew's elder brother, also Duke of Brittany
1119 – 1148 Conan II, Alan's son
1148– 1156 Hoël III, Conan's son
1156 – 1158 Geoffrey I FitzEmpress, younger brother of Henry II of England 
1158 Conan III, Hoël III's nephew, seized the County and Nantes before returning it to Henry of England
1158 – 1185 Henry II of England, gained the county under his treaty with the Duke of Brittany
1185 – 1186 Geoffrey II, Henry II's fourth son, married to Conan's daughter Constance
1185 – 1201 Constance, Conan's daughter and heiress, married to Henry II's son Geoffrey
1196 – 1203 Arthur, their son

The County of Nantes was merged permanently into the Ducal crown of Brittany, and subsequently the crown of France, through Constance's descendants.

Notes

References 

 
Nantes